Voula is a southern suburb of Athens along the Athens coast and former municipality in East Attica, Greece. Since the 2011 local government reform it is part of the municipality Vari-Voula-Vouliagmeni, of which it is the seat and a municipal unit. The municipal unit has an area of 8.787 km2. Grigoris Konstantellos is the incumbent mayor, elected for a second term at May 26, 2019, for the unified municipality of Vari-Voula-Vouliagmeni.

Geography

Voula is a southern suburb of Athens, 16 km south of the city centre. It is located on the Saronic Gulf coast, at the southwestern foot of the Hymettus mountain. Adjacent coast towns are Glyfada to the northwest and Vouliagmeni to the south. The Greek National Road 91 (Athens center - Sounio) passes through Voula. One of the largest hospitals in the Athens conurbation, "Asklipieio", lies in the northern part of Voula. It is served by the southern terminus of the Athens Tram line T7, Asklipieio Voulas.

Climate

Voula has a hot semi-arid climate (Köppen climate classification: BSh), bordering on a hot-summer Mediterranean climate (Köppen climate classification: Csa). Voula experiences hot, dry summers and mild, wetter winters.

Historical population

Sports
Voula hosts the football club Aris Voulas, founded in 1952, the basketball club Proteas Voulas, founded in 1980 and the women's volleyball team Thetis founded in 2000.

See also
List of municipalities of Attica

References

External links
Municipality of Voula
Greek Travel Pages

Vari-Voula-Vouliagmeni
Populated places in East Attica